Alessia Verstappen (born 20 June 2006) is a Belgian rhythmic gymnast. She's the first individual gymnast from her country to attend the World Championships.

Personal life 
Verstappen took up the sport at age 5, after her parents noticed she was a problem eater as a toddler and decided to make her do sport. At first they opted for ballet so Alessia would follow in the footsteps of her great-grandmother, but then she saw rhythmic gymnastics at the Olympics and fell in love. She trains 7 to 8 hours a day and her dream is to compete at the 2024 Olympic Games in Paris. She speaks Dutch and Russian.

Career 
Alessia debuted internationally at the 1st Junior World Championships in Moscow along her teammate Alexandra Safronova, she performed only with rope scoring 12.100 that put her in 41st place. 

In May 2022, her first senior year, she became Belgian champion ahead of Carina Iacos and Oona De Decker. A month later she competed in the European Championships in Tel Aviv, where she was 54th in the All-Around, 55th with hoop, 63rd with ball, 44th with clubs and 54th with ribbon. In September she was selected as the sole representative for Belgium for the World Championships in Sofia, becoming the first Belgian to compete in such competition, she ended 58th in the All-Around, 52nd with hoop, 65th with ball, 53rd with clubs and 62nd with ribbon.

Achievements 

 First rhythmic gymnast representing Belgium to compete at the World Championships when she participated in the 2022 edition of the tournament in Sofia, Bulgaria.

References 

2006 births
Living people
Belgian rhythmic gymnasts
People from Sint-Niklaas